Epistomological Despondency is the first studio album by British doom metal band Esoteric. The album was released in 1994 as a double CD through Aesthetic Death Records, and was remastered and reissued in 2004. In a retrospective article written about the album by Metal Injection editor Cody Davis, the album "built Esoteric's foundation in funeral doom."

Track listing

Credits
 Bryan Beck – Bass guitar, fretless bass, effects and bass synth
 Gordon Bicknell – Lead guitar, effects, samples, synth
 Greg Chandler – vocals, effects
 Simon Phillips – Lead guitar, effects, samples
 Stuart Blekinsop – Guitar, effects
 Darren Earl – drums
 Steve Wilson - engineering, mixing

References

External links
Epistemological Despondency on Discogs
Epistemological Despondency on Bandcamp

1994 debut albums
Esoteric (band) albums